The Scottish Adjacent Waters Boundaries Order 1999 is a statutory instrument of the United Kingdom government, defining the boundaries of internal waters, territorial sea, and British Fishing Limits adjacent to Scotland. It was introduced in accordance with the Scotland Act 1998, which established the devolved Scottish Parliament.

Defining jurisdictions
The territorial waters defined come under the jurisdiction of Scots law, and are also used for defining the area of operation of the Scottish Government (including Marine Scotland), SEPA, and other Scottish Government agencies and public bodies.

The territorial waters defined as not being Scottish waters come under the jurisdiction of either English law or Northern Ireland law. Because the order defines the territorial limits of the three separate jurisdictions, it comprises a piece of constitutional law in the constitution of the United Kingdom.

Scottish waters
Scottish waters is a colloquial term which can refer to different sea areas, including:
  Internal waters and territorial sea adjacent to Scotland. ("Scotland" as defined in the Scotland Act 1998)
  British Fishing Limits adjacent to Scotland. ("The Scottish Zone" as defined in the Scotland Act 1998)
 The UK continental shelf limits adjacent to Scotland. (Part of the "Scottish offshore marine region" as defined in the Marine and Coastal Access Act 2009)

Differences with existing boundaries
The maritime boundary adopted by the order is an equidistant boundary. This differed from the boundary established by the Civil Jurisdiction (Offshore Activities) Act 1987 which defined a straight line border between Scotland and England in the North Sea along the latitude of 55° 50' 00"N.

As a result, some oil fields previously subject to Scots civil law were transferred to English jurisdiction. Professor Alex Kemp of the University of Aberdeen argued that the movement of the line did not make much difference from an economic perspective, "because [these] are just a handful of fields, and [no longer] very important ones".

Potential implications for Scottish independence

The Scottish National Party opposed the order and the methods used to calculate the boundary in the North Sea.

In 2015, the Scottish Cabinet Secretary for Rural Affairs and Environment, Richard Lochhead, wrote to the UK Government requesting a review of the order.

In 2001, Mahdi Zahraa of Glasgow Caledonian University, published a discussion paper in the European Journal of International Law detailing different methods of establishing an Anglo-Scottish marine boundary. The author suggests that a perpendicular boundary, derived from a new straight baseline on the east coast of Scotland and England, combined with an area of shared jurisdiction, would be the most equitable solution.

Supporters of Scottish independence such as Craig Murray have also argued for a perpendicular boundary based on a straight baseline.

See also
Anglo-Scottish border

References

External links
The Scottish Adjacent Waters Boundaries Order 1999
Map of the boundary defined in the Scottish Adjacent Waters Boundaries Order 1999
26 April 2000 - Official Report of debate regarding the Order in the Scottish Parliament
Scottish Executive - press release, 9 Dec 1999
Scottish Ministers' proposals for the designation of marine boundaries in coastal and transitional waters

Law of the sea
Constitutional laws of Scotland
Economy of Scotland
Fishing in Scotland
Statutory Instruments of the United Kingdom
1999 in British law
1999 in Scotland
Borders of Scotland
Admiralty law in the United Kingdom
North Sea
Shipping in Scotland
Water transport in Scotland
Scottish coast
Territorial evolution